Said Abd al-Ahad Khan (26 March 1859 in Karmana – 3 January 1911) was the 7th Emir of the Uzbek Manghit dynasty, the last ruling dynasty of the Emirate of Bukhara, which at the time was a part of the Russian Empire. He ascended to the title aged 26 upon the death of his father, Muzaffar bin Nasrullah, on 12 November 1885.

Abd al-Ahad was educated at a Russian military school and obtained the rank of adjutant-general in the Russian army. He brought more Russian influence into Bukharan life. He made attempts at reforms but was frustrated by conservatives and in his later years took to drinking.

He married, and his eldest son, Sayyid Mir Muhammad Alim Khan, succeeded him after his death.

References

External links

1859 births
1911 deaths
People from Navoiy Region
Emirs of Bukhara
Recipients of the Order of St. Vladimir, 1st class
Recipients of the Order of the White Eagle (Russia)
Recipients of the Order of Saint Stanislaus (Russian), 2nd class